The 18th Street Expressway Bridge is a one level deck truss, four lane crossing of the Kansas River in Kansas City, Kansas.
It was built in 1959, to replace the Argentine Bridge to the west.
It also rises above the BNSF railroad tracks.
It was damaged in 2000, after a BNSF train derailed and destroyed one of the piers, which caused the south approach span to buckle, and disabled it for several months while it was being repaired.

The bridge has no significant shoulder (breakdown lane) and no pedestrian walkway.

Bridges over the Kansas River
Bridges in Kansas City, Kansas
Bridges completed in 1959
Road bridges in Kansas
U.S. Route 69
Bridges of the United States Numbered Highway System
1959 establishments in Kansas
Truss bridges in the United States